Metamorphosis in the Slaughterhouse is a 2021 Iranian thriller-drama film directed by Javad Daraei about of a girl named Shadi whose parents have been accused of murder. It won the Special Legacy Award and Bumblebee Award (AGAINST ALL ODDS) at the event in the  Bare Bones film festival

Cast

Festivals and awards

References

External links 
 

Iranian independent films
2020s Persian-language films
Iranian drama films
2021 films